Halfmoon Bay (xwilkway in she shashishalhem, the Sechelt language) is a small community of about 2,800 people, many of whom are only summer residents. It is a large scalloped bay protected from the open sea by South Thormanby Island and Vancouver Island. It encompasses a small village of permanent homes, summer cottages and five regional parks on the Sunshine Coast of British Columbia. It belongs to Electoral Area B in the Sunshine Coast Regional District.

The community can be reached by the uniquely named Redrooffs Road, so-called because a popular local resort once featured a cluster of tourist cabins, all with red roofs. Some homes are also located off Highway 101.

Halfmoon Bay Elementary School, the community's only elementary school, has 200–300 students ranging from kindergarten to grade seven. This school has performed extremely well for one of its size, achieving BC / Foundation Skills Assessment (FSA) scores above those of many private schools.  After graduating, grade seven students can go to one of the three high schools on the southern Sunshine Coast: Pender Harbour Secondary, Chatelech Secondary (in Sechelt), and Elphinstone Secondary (in Gibsons).

The area in and around Halfmoon Bay was originally inhabited solely by the Shishalh people of the Coast Salish First Nations. Halfmoon Bay's settlers chose the area for its mild climate and abundance of fresh water and natural food (fish, shellfish, berries and roots). The Shishalh tribe became known as the Sechelts, a derivation of she'shalt, meaning "the people". Roberts Creek formed the boundary between the Sechelt people to the north and the Squamish people to the south.

Originally named Priestland Bay after the Priestland family who settled in the area in 1899, its present name comes from the shape of Halfmoon Bay.

Climate 
Halfmoon Bay has a warm Mediterranean climate (Csb) near an Oceanic climate (Cfb)

References

External links 
 

Designated places in British Columbia
Populated places in the Sunshine Coast Regional District
Unincorporated settlements in British Columbia